The name Oli has been used for two tropical cyclones in the South Pacific Ocean.

Cyclone Oli (1993) – made landfall in Fiji.
Cyclone Oli (2010) – affected French Polynesia.

Oli